Lotman is a surname. Notable people with the surname include:

 Aleksei Lotman (born 1960), Estonian biologist, son of Juri Lotman
 Herb Lotman (1933–2014), U.S. food industry magnate
 Juri Lotman (1922–1993), Russian formalist critic, semiotician, and culturologist
 Mihhail Lotman (born 1952), son of Juri Lotman, Estonian literature researcher and politician

Jewish surnames